Zsuzsa Nádor (19 September 1927 – 14 April 2015) was a Hungarian swimmer. She competed in the women's 100 metre freestyle at the 1948 Summer Olympics.

At the 1950 Maccabiah Games, representing Great Britain, she won gold medals in the 100 m back, the 100 m crawl, and the 400 m freestyle. At the 1953 Maccabiah Games, again representing Great Britain, she won the silver medal in the 400 m crawl, behind future Olympian Shoshana Ribner of Israel.

References

1927 births
2015 deaths
Maccabiah Games gold medalists for Great Britain
Maccabiah Games silver medalists for Great Britain
Maccabiah Games medalists in swimming
Competitors at the 1950 Maccabiah Games
Olympic swimmers of Hungary
Swimmers at the 1948 Summer Olympics
Swimmers from Budapest
Hungarian female freestyle swimmers
20th-century Hungarian women
21st-century Hungarian women